William Brown Ide (March 28, 1796 – December 19 or 20, 1852) was an American pioneer who headed the short-lived California Republic in 1846.

Life
William Ide was born in Rutland, Massachusetts to Lemuel Ide, a member of the Vermont State Legislature. A carpenter by trade, Ide married Susan Grout Haskell (1799–1850) in 1820. He and his wife Susan lived at first in Massachusetts, but soon began moving westward—to Kentucky, then to Ohio and finally to Illinois. They farmed in Springfield, where Ide supplemented his income by teaching school.

Since at least as early as 1886 and as late as 1993, some historians have argued that Ide was never a member of The Church of Jesus Christ of Latter-day Saints. This argument was settled in 2014 in the affirmative, however, when researchers Roger Robin Ekins, Michael N. Landon and Richard K. Behrens—building on the work of David Freeman and Ronald L. "Smokey" Bassett—positively identified an unsigned letter in the archives of the LDS Church as being penned by Ide. Ekins has laid out all of the arguments on both sides of this controversy, positively concluding that Ide was baptized a Mormon in July 1837, was likely set apart as the President of the Springville Branch of the Church in July 1844 and was called on a mission to assist Joseph Smith's campaign for the Presidency of the United States on April 6, 1844. Accordingly, Ide and his family were the first known Mormons to enter California and Ide—as commander of the short-lived California Republic—was, arguably, the first LDS head of state.

In 1845, Ide sold his farm and joined a wagon train in Independence, Missouri headed for Oregon. On the advice of the mountain man Caleb Greenwood, Ide and a group of settlers split off and headed to Alta California, then a province of Mexico. They arrived at Sutter's Fort on October 25, 1845. Ide traveled north to work for Peter Lassen on Rancho Bosquejo.

In 1846, on a report that the Mexican government was threatening to expel all settlers who were not Mexican citizens, about thirty settlers conducted what was to become known as the Bear Flag Revolt. On June 14, Ide and the others seized the pueblo of Sonoma and captured the Mexican Commandante of Northern California, Mariano Guadalupe Vallejo, who in fact supported American annexation. On June 15, Ide released the Proclamation he had written the night before.  By noon of June 17, the rebels raised the new California Bear Flag, proclaiming the Mexican province to be the California Republic. Ide had been chosen to serve as commander.

Ide's proclamation 

William B. Ide wrote a proclamation announcing and explaining the reasons for the revolt during the night of June 14–15, 1846 (below).  There were additional copies and some more moderate versions (produced in both English and Spanish) distributed around northern California through June 18.

The Bear Flag Republic lasted until July 9, 1846, just 25 days, until the U.S. Flag was raised at Sonoma.  Ide and other "Bear Flaggers" joined John C. Frémont and the U.S. armed forces in taking possession of California from Mexico.

After the Mexican–American War, Ide returned to his home near Red Bluff, California, where he resumed his partnership with Josiah Belden at his Rancho Barranca Colorado. He bought out Belden in 1849, and was successful in mining. Ide went on to a distinguished career as a public servant in Colusi County (the precursor to portions of today's Colusa, Glenn and Tehama Counties).  There he served as Probate and County Judge, Presiding Judge of the Court of Sessions, County Recorder, County Auditor, County Clerk, County Treasurer, Deputy County Surveyor and Deputy Sheriff.

Ide died of smallpox in December 1852, probably during the night of the 19th–20th, at the age of 56. He is buried in a small cemetery on the east side of Highway 45, 5 miles south of Hamilton City at the former site of Monroeville where a monument is visible from the road. On June 7, 2014 new gravestones, created by William B. Ide Adobe State Historic Park docent David Freeman and assisted by members of the Chico California Stake of The Church of Jesus Christ of Latter-Day Saints, were dedicated by S. Dennis Holland, President of the California Pioneer Heritage Foundation & Director of Public Affairs of LDS Historic Sites in California.

Legacy
William B. Ide Adobe State Historic Park, comprising a restored adobe house and other buildings near Red Bluff, commemorates his life.

References

Further reading
 
 
 
 Hubert H. Bancroft's History of California, Vol. V.   1846-1848
 
 
  

American people of the Bear Flag Revolt
People of the Conquest of California
1796 births
1852 deaths
American carpenters
Commanders of the California Republic
People of Mexican California
People from Rutland, Massachusetts
People from Red Bluff, California
Deaths from smallpox
Infectious disease deaths in California
Heads of state of former countries
Latter Day Saints from Massachusetts
Latter Day Saints from California